Glyptopleura marginata is a species of North American plants in the family Asteraceae. The common names for this plant include carveseed, keysia, and crustleaf.

The species is native to the Western United States, primarily the Great Basin region in California, Nevada, Utah, Oregon, and Idaho.

References

External links
Jepson Manual Treatment
United States Department of Agriculture Plants Profile
Calphotos Photo gallery, University of California

Flora of the Western United States
Plants described in 1871
Cichorieae
Flora without expected TNC conservation status